Sagina Mahato is a 1970 Bengali film produced by Shri J. K. Kapur and directed by Tapan Sinha. The film stars Dilip Kumar and Saira Banu. The film is based on the true story of the labour movement of 1942–43, told through with fictional characters, and the mock trial of Sagina Mahato, the trade union leader of a factory in Siliguri. It was entered into the 7th Moscow International Film Festival. The film was shot on locations in Kurseong, near Darjeeling. A diamond-jubilee hit, it created box-office records in Bengal. The film was remade as a Hindi film titled Sagina in 1974, by Sinha with the same leads, produced by the same producers team J.K. Kapur and Hemen Ganguly, though this version wasn't commercially successful. Film music composed by playback singer Anup Ghoshal.

Plot
This is story of a tea estate labour leader in the north eastern region of India during the British Raj. Sagina Mahato fights for the rights of the labourers and has the courage to face the tyranny of the British bosses. He is helped by a young communist Amal who comes to the place to upraise the poor and downtrodden masses. Amal, an outsider, turned Sagina as a leader and thus alienated him from the mass by elaborating, appropriating, codifying, approximating his social hierarchy. The story by Gour Kishor Ghosh (first published in Desh25:12, 18 January 1958, reveals the problems of vulgar vanguardism from the radical humanist standpoint.

Casts
 Dilip Kumar as Sagina Mahato
 Saira Banu as Lalita
 Anil Chatterjee
 Bhanu Bandopadhyay
 Swarup Dutta
 Sumita Sanyal
 Romi Chowdhury
 Kalyan Chatterjee

Awards
BFJA Awards in 1971

 Best Actor: Dilip Kumar
 Best Actor in Supporting Role: Anil Chatterjee
 Best Art Direction: Suniti Mitra
 Best Music: Tapan Sinha
 Best Male Playback Singer Award: Anup Ghoshal

8th Moscow International Film Festival

 Best Afro-Asian Film

See also
 History of tea in India

References

External links
 Sagina Mahato in Gomolo.in
 
 Sagina Mahato, Promotional Booklet (1970) British Library

1970 films
Bengali-language Indian films
Films directed by Tapan Sinha
Films about the labor movement
History of tea
Films set in the British Raj
Indian films based on actual events
Films set in the 1940s
1970s Bengali-language films
Bengali films remade in other languages